was a district located in Aichi, Japan.

Located on the northeastern Owari Region, covering the current cities of Komaki, Kasugai, Seto, and Owariasahi.

See also
List of dissolved districts of Japan
Aichi Prefecture

Higashikasugai District